CP Puppis (or Nova Puppis 1942) was a bright nova occurring in the constellation Puppis in 1942. 
The nova was discovered on 9 November 1942 by Bernhard Dawson at La Plata, Argentina, when it had an apparent visual magnitude of about 2. It was independently discovered at 18:00 10 November 1942 (UT) by a 19-year-old Japanese schoolgirl, Kuniko Sofue, who looked at the sky after patching her socks and noticed the nova.  For this discovery, asteroid 7189 Kuniko was named in her honor.

From a 17th magnitude star, it reached an apparent visual magnitude of –0.2 then began a rapid decline. It had dropped by three magnitudes in an interval of 6.5 days, one of the sharpest declines ever noted for a nova. About 14 years later, the shell ejected by the nova event was detected, which allowed the distance to be computed. In 2000, this distance was revised to  after correcting for probable errors. The Gaia spacecraft later measured the parallax of the star leading to an accurate distance of  parsecs.

The nova outburst can be explained by a white dwarf that is accreting matter from a companion; most likely a low-mass main sequence star. This close binary system has an orbital period of 1.47 hours, which is one of the shortest periods of the known classical nova. Unusually, the white dwarf may have a magnetic field. Other properties of the system remain uncertain, although observations of X-ray emission from the system suggest that the white dwarf has a mass of more than 1.1 times the mass of the Sun.

References

External links
  S.Balman,M.Orio,H.Ögelman - copyright the American Astronomical Society retrieved 21/09/2011
 B.Warner,Department of Astronomy,University of Cape Town retrieved 21/09/2011
 https://web.archive.org/web/20051026122516/http://www.otticademaria.it/astro/Costellazioni/st_pup.html

Novae
Puppis
1942 in science
Puppis, CP